The British Residency, also known as the Government Guest House or Residency Bungalow, is a two-storeyed palace situated at Asramam in the city of Kollam in the Indian state of Kerala. It lies close to the site of the old Kollam Airport situated at Asramam in the city and was built by Colonel John Munro between 1811 and 1819. It is a noted Kollam landmark like the Chinnakada Clock Tower.

Architecture and structure
The British residency vali 
unique symmetry and harmonious blending of variegated artistic features. During the British Raj, the building served as the British Residency. It was built during the Travancore era by Gowri Parvati Bayi when Colonel John Munro was the British Resident. A blend of European, Indian and Tuscan architecture, the central portion of the building has a rounded front, with a large gable decoration. Atop the building there is a crown with a lion seated on it, with the motto Dieu et mon Droit (God and my right) inscribed above. The  entrance doors are made up of glass panes. The conference hall in the palace has an antechamber with an adjustable partition-like door while a large fanlight arching over divides the two rooms. The building has rich wooden flooring on the upper storey. The walls of the conference hall having cornices and dentils bordering the four sides with embossed designs of festoons, urns, and floral forms. A motif of a large arch with an ornamental keystone, resting on pillars is embossed over the main doorway. The Edward Rose garden is another main attraction of the mansion.

Antique prints in polished wooden frames adorn the walls including one that depicts the battle of Seringapatnam, dating from 1802. Prof. Pandala has described the Residency as "one of the most elegant buildings in India".

See also

 Residencies of British India
 Thevally Palace
 Cheena Kottaram
 Chinnakada Clock Tower
 Architecture of Kerala

References

Residencies of British India
Tourist attractions in Kollam
Palaces in Kollam
Buildings and structures completed in 1819
1819 establishments in India